The International Bayern Rundfahrt was a stage race cycling race held each year in Bavaria, Germany, between 1980 and 2015. The race was held as an amateur race between 1980 and 1988, and from 2005 to 2015, the race was organised as a 2.HC event on the UCI Europe Tour. In December 2015, the organisers cancelled the 2016 event due to a budget shortfall, and the race has not been held since.

Winners (from 1989)

By year

Multiple winners

Riders in italic are still active.

Wins per country

References

External links
 

UCI Europe Tour races
Cycle races in Germany
Recurring sporting events established in 1980
1980 establishments in West Germany
Sports competitions in Bavaria
 
Recurring sporting events disestablished in 2015
2015 disestablishments in Germany